The Oregon World War II Memorial to Oregon veterans of World War II, is located the grounds of the Oregon State Capitol, in Salem, Oregon, United States. Nine memorial plaques recount the stories of action of Oregon Army, Marines, Navy, Air Corps, National Guard, and civilians.  A memorial wall records the names of those killed in action. A granite pavement featuring an inscribed world map, with stars indicating the theaters of war where Oregon soldiers, sailors, marines and airmen served, surrounding an obelisk which is blank and unadorned.

It was dedicated on June 6, 2014.

Memorial Wall and Names 

There is also a memorial plaque to Portland cabaret singer and later prisoner-of-war Claire Phillips, who served as a spymistress in Japanese occupied Manila for the allies and the Philippine resistance.

See also
 Oregon Department of Veterans' Affairs
 Veterans Affairs Medical Center (Oregon)
 2014 in art

References

External links
 
 

2014 establishments in Oregon
2014 sculptures
Military monuments and memorials in the United States
Monuments and memorials in Salem, Oregon
Obelisks in the United States
Outdoor sculptures in Salem, Oregon
World War II memorials in the United States